{{Automatic taxobox
| image = 
| taxon = Philodryas
| authority = Wagler, 1830
| subdivision_ranks = Species
| subdivision =
See text
| synonyms = Atamophis, Callirhinus, Chlorosoma, Dirrhox, Dryophylax, Euophrys, Galeophis, Herpetodryas, Lygophis, Pseudablabes, Teleolepis, Xenodon 
}}Philodryas is a genus of colubrid snakes endemic to South America, commonly called green snakes.

Description
Species in the genus Philodryas share the following characters:

Head distinct from neck, with distinct canthus rostralis. Eye moderate or large. Pupil round. Body cylindrical or slightly laterally compressed. Tail long.

Dorsal scales arranged in 17 to 23 rows at midbody, more or less obliquely. Subcaudals divided (in two rows).

Maxillary teeth smallest anteriorly, 12–15, followed after a gap by two large grooved fangs located just behind the posterior border of the eye.

Venom
Although colubrid snakes are usually harmless to humans, Philodryas are opisthoglyphous (rear-fanged) snakes and can give a venomous bite.

Species and geographic ranges
There are 16 recognized species. www.reptile-database.org.Philodryas aestiva  – N Argentina, Bolivia, SE Brazil, Paraguay, UruguayPhilodryas agassizii  – Brazil, Argentina, Uruguay, ParaguayPhilodryas arnaldoi  – BrazilPhilodryas baroni  – N ArgentinaPhilodryas boliviana Boulenger, 1896 – BoliviaPhilodryas chamissonis (Wiegmann, 1834) – ChilePhilodryas cordata  – VenezuelaPhilodryas erlandi Lönnberg, 1902 – Paraguay, southeastern Bolivia, northern ArgentinaPhilodryas livida  – BrazilPhilodryas mattogrossensis  – Bolivia, SW Brazil, ParaguayPhilodryas nattereri  – WC Brazil, ParaguayPhilodryas olfersii  – Argentina, Bolivia, W Brazil, Paraguay, E Peru, UruguayPhilodryas patagoniensis  – Brazil, Bolivia, Paraguay, Argentina, UruguayPhilodryas psammophidea  – Argentina, W & S BrazilPhilodryas trilineata  – ArgentinaPhilodryas varia  – Argentina, BoliviaNota bene: A binomial authority in parentheses indicates that the species was originally described in a genus other than Philodryas.

References

Further reading
Wagler JG (1830). Natürliches System der Amphibien, mit vorangehender Classification des Säugthiere und Vögel. Ein Beitrag zur vergleichenden Zoologie. Munich, Stuttgart, and Tübingen: J.G. Cotta. vi + 354 pp. (Philodryas'', new genus, p. 185). (in German and Latin).
https://serpientesdevenezuela.org/philodryas-viridissima/

Colubrids
Snake genera
Taxa named by Johann Georg Wagler